Jasmina Cibic (born in Ljubljana in 1979) is a Slovenian performance, installation and film artist who lives and works in London. Her work often explores the construction of national cultures, their underlying ideologies, political goals and uses, as well as the soft power of the arts, particularly architecture.

Art career 
Cibic studied at the Accademia di Bella Arti in Venice, and then took a Masters in Fine Art at Goldsmiths in London, graduating in 2006.

In 2013, Cibic represented Slovenia in its Pavilion at the 55th Venice Biennale, with a project entitled 'For Our Economy and Culture'. This included two films shot at official state locations, One, Framing the Space, was shot at Josep Broz Tito's residence at Lake Bled, where he received royalty and other dignitaries, and dramatised a conversation between state architect Vinko Glanz and a journalist about the uses of national architecture. The other, The Fruit of Our Lands, recreated a Yugoslav parliamentary debate held in 1957 to discuss which artworks might be suitable to 'decorate' the newly built People's Assembly (now the National Assembly Building of Slovenia), designed and built between 1954 and 1959 by Glanz. Cibic told Aesthetica that she found the transcript of this debate - which her film re-enacted word-for-word, and played on a continuous loop - 'in a dank garage within a shopping trolley filled with the archives of the former Yugoslav state architect', and that she had not found any record of it in official state archives.

Spielraum: The Nation Loves It (2015), which featured a woman practising a speech to launch a new 'ambitious building programme', also used found dialogue but removed specific names from speeches, referring instead to 'the artist' or 'our country'. The final part of her Spielraum trilogy, Tear Down and Rebuild (2015) was filmed inside the Modernist interior of the former Palace of the Federation building (now the Palace of Serbia) in Belgrade, using quotations pulled from speeches by Ronald Reagan, Prince Charles, Benito Mussolini, Margaret Thatcher and others, as well as architectural theory and Yugoslav debates, for its dialogue.

The Pavilion (2015) was a short, experimental documentary about the (Serbian, Croatian and Slovene) Kingdom of Yugoslavia's Pavilion for the 1929 Barcelona International Exposition (Expo '29). The Yugoslav entry, designed by Serbian modernist architect Dragiša Brašovan, supposedly won the Grand Prix and then lost it to Ludwig Mies van der Rohe's design for Germany due to political intrigue. In the video, a narrator described Cibic's methods to retrace the lost Pavilion, which was torn down after the end of Expo '29, as five performers built a model of Brašovan's star-shaped building in 1:7 scale.

Cibic was winner of the Jarman awards 2021, for her work The Gift.

References

External links 
 Artist's website

Slovenian women artists
Artists from Ljubljana
Slovenian expatriates in the United Kingdom
Living people
1979 births
Accademia di Belle Arti di Venezia alumni